Revolution Roulette is the third album by the Finnish rock band Poets of the Fall. It was released in Finland on 26 March 2008 and went straight to the top of the Finnish charts. It was certified gold by IFPI Finland two weeks after being released.

Since 12 April 2008, the album is available for worldwide purchase via the iTunes Store.

Track listing

Release history

Singles

References

Poets of the Fall albums
2008 albums